Sébastien Pourcel (born 11 February 1985) is a French former professional motocross racer. He competed in the Motocross World Championships from 2002 to 2014.

Pourcel was born in Martigues, Bouches-du-Rhône. He started international motocross competition in 2002 in the MX2-GP class. In 2007, he moved up to the premier MX1-GP class and finished in a career-high fourth place. He joined his brother Christophe Pourcel on the official Kawasaki GPKR Team, which was started by their father, Roger, and Patrick Gelade.

References

External links 
 Sébastien Pourcel's page at GPKR

1985 births
Living people
People from Martigues
French motocross riders
Sportspeople from Bouches-du-Rhône